Michael Mortensen (born 12 March 1961) is a former professional tennis player from Denmark.

Mortensen achieved a career-high doubles ranking of world No. 34 in 1988 and a career-high singles ranking of world No. 301 in 1984. He won five ATP doubles titles.

Mortensen participated in 22 Davis Cup ties for Denmark from 1979 to 1990, posting an 11–13 record in doubles and a 12–14 record in singles.

Mortensen later became a coach. He was the captain of the Denmark Fed Cup team in 2011 competing for 2011 Fed Cup Europe/Africa Zone Group I. Among players he coached was the WTA top-5 player and Chinese No. 1 Li Na, who won the 2011 French Open Women's Singles title under Mortensen.

Career finals

Doubles: 12 (5 titles, 7 runner-ups)

References

External links
 
 
 

1961 births
Danish male tennis players
People from Glostrup Municipality
Danish tennis coaches
Living people
Sportspeople from the Capital Region of Denmark